Aubrey Cosens VC (21 May 1921 – 26 February 1945) was a Canadian posthumous recipient of the Victoria Cross, the highest and most prestigious award for gallantry in the face of the enemy that can be awarded to British and Commonwealth forces.

Military service
Aubrey Cosens was born in Latchford, Ontario on May 21, 1921, the only son to Mr. and Mrs. Charles Cosens.  Shortly afterwards his family moved near Porquis Junction and this is where Cosens remained until he left school at 17 and went to work as a section hand on the Temiskaming and Northern Ontario Railway.

A year after taking this job, the Second World War broke out and Aubrey attempted to
join the RCAF and was rejected because he was considered too young.

In 1940 he joined The Argyll and Sutherland Highlanders of Canada as private and later transferred to The Queen's Own Rifles of Canada as a Corporal. He was promoted Sergeant while serving as part of the D-day reinforcements in Normandy, France.

He was 23 years old and a sergeant in The Queen's Own Rifles of Canada during the Canadian Army's involvement in the Second World War.

On the night of 25–26 February 1945 at Mooshof near Uedem, Germany, B and D Coys of The Queen's Own Rifles of Canada led a series of attacks on German strongholds. During the battle his Platoon Commander was killed-in-action and the platoon took heavy casualties. Sergeant Cosens assumed command of the four survivors of his platoon whom he placed in position to give him covering fire. Running forward alone to a tank, he took up an exposed position in front of the turret and directed its fire. When a further counter-attack had been repulsed, he ordered the tank to ram  some farm buildings into which the Germans attackers had retreated. He went in alone, killing 22 of the defenders and taking the rest prisoners. He then dealt similarly with the occupants of two more buildings, but was shot by a sniper when he went to report back to superior officers.

Legacy
Aubrey Cosens was mentioned in Robert Heinlein's Starship Troopers, albeit misspelled.

Little ships,  the ones named for foot sloggers: Horatius, Alvin York, Swamp Fox,  the Rog  herself,  bless her  heart, Colonel  Bowie,  Devereux, Vercingetorix, Sandino, Aubrey Cousens, Kamehameha, Audie Murphy, Xenophon, Aguinaldo --

Grave/memorial at Buried at Groesbeek Canadian War Cemetery in the Netherlands. Plot VIII. row H. Grave 2. Headstone.

See also
 Sgt. Aubrey Cosens VC Memorial Bridge

References

External links
 CWGC: Aubrey Cosens
 Legion Magazine article
 COSENS, Aubrey
 On-Line Memorial
 "Searching For Aubrey" by Angus Scully

Cosens,Aubrey
Cosens,Aubrey
Canadian World War II recipients of the Victoria Cross
People from Haldimand County
Canadian military personnel killed in World War II
Queen's Own Rifles of Canada soldiers
Burials at Groesbeek Canadian War Cemetery
Canadian military personnel from Ontario
Canadian Army personnel of World War II
Argyll and Sutherland Highlanders of Canada (Princess Louise's) soldiers